Majical Cloudz was a Canadian music group from Montreal consisting of singer-songwriter Devon Welsh and Matt Otto. The group disbanded in March 2016.

History
Welsh, the son of actor Kenneth Welsh and Corinne Farago, began Majical Cloudz as a collaborative open project in Halifax, Nova Scotia, in 2010. Welsh first collaborated with friend Matthew E. Duffy, releasing a self-titled cassette on Numbers Station, followed by an EP, Earth to a Friend/Mountain Eyes. They released their debut full-length album II in 2011. Duffy left the group shortly after in 2011.

Otto, an electronic musician with a penchant for abstract soundscapes, joined in 2012, appearing for the first time on the EP Turns, Turns, Turns.

Their second album, Impersonator, was released May 21, 2013 on Matador Records, and was a longlisted nominee for the 2013 Polaris Music Prize. The band toured extensively throughout North America and Europe to support the album, including performances at Toronto's NXNE festival and New York City's Northside Festival. Pitchfork ranked Impersonator as their eighth best album of 2013.

In 2014, the group toured with Lorde on the North American leg of her tour.

The band's third album, Are You Alone?, was released on October 16, 2015 to critical acclaim. The album was nominated for a Juno Award.

In January, 2016, the band released an EP, called Wait And See. The group again collaborated with Owen Pallett, who also appeared on Are You Alone?

On March 4, 2016, Welsh announced on social media that he and Otto were going their separate ways, and that Are You Alone? would be their last full release. Both Welsh and Otto have gone on to pursue other projects.

Discography

Studio albums
 Majical Cloudz (2010)
 II (2011)
 Impersonator (2013)
 Are You Alone? (2015)

EPs
 Earth to a Friend/Mountain Eyes (2011)
 Turns Turns Turns (2012)
 Wait & See (2016)

Singles
 Childhood's End (2013)
 Tour Journals (2014)

References

External Links
 
 

Art pop musicians
Canadian indie pop groups
Canadian synthpop groups
Musical groups from Montreal
Musical groups established in 2010
Musical groups disestablished in 2016
2010 establishments in Quebec
2016 disestablishments in Quebec
Arbutus Records artists